Danny Fuchs (born 25 February 1976) is a German former professional footballer who played as a midfielder.

References

External links
 

1976 births
Living people
People from Dessau-Roßlau
People from Bezirk Halle
German footballers
Footballers from Saxony-Anhalt
Association football midfielders
Bundesliga players
2. Bundesliga players
Hallescher FC players
VfL Bochum players
VfL Bochum II players
Karlsruher SC players
TSV 1860 Munich II players
SpVgg Greuther Fürth players
SV Wehen Wiesbaden players
1. FC Kaiserslautern players